Claimed coincidences connecting U.S. Presidents  Abraham Lincoln and John F. Kennedy are a piece of American folklore of unknown origin. The list of coincidences appeared in the mainstream American press in 1964, a year after the assassination of John F. Kennedy, having appeared prior to that in the GOP Congressional Committee Newsletter. In the 1970s, Martin Gardner examined the list in an article in Scientific American (later reprinted in his 1985 book, The Magic Numbers of Dr. Matrix), pointing out that several of the claimed coincidences were based on misinformation. Gardner's version of the list contained 16 items; many subsequent versions have circulated much longer lists. 

A 1999 examination by Snopes found that the listed "coincidences are easily explained as the simple product of mere chance." In 1992, the Skeptical Inquirer ran a "Spooky Presidential Coincidences Contest." One winner found a series of sixteen similar coincidences between Kennedy and former Mexican President Álvaro Obregón, while the other came up with similar lists for twenty-one pairs of U.S. presidents.

List
The following are the list of "coincidences" that are commonly associated with the conspiracy, some of which are not true statements:

 "Lincoln" and "Kennedy" each have seven letters.
 Both presidents were elected to Congress in '46 and later to the presidency in '60.
 Both assassins, John Wilkes Booth and Lee Harvey Oswald, were born in '39 and were known by their three names, composed of fifteen letters.
 Booth ran from a theater and was caught in a warehouse; Oswald ran from a warehouse and was caught in a theater.
 The assassins were both Southerners.
 Both of the presidents' successors were named Johnson and born in '08.
 Both Lincoln and Kennedy were particularly concerned with civil rights and made their views strongly known.
 Both presidents were shot in the head on a Friday.
 Lincoln had a secretary named Kennedy who told him not to go to Ford's Theatre. Kennedy had a secretary named Evelyn Lincoln and she warned him not to go to Dallas.
 Both Oswald and Booth were assassinated before they could be put on trial.

Accuracy

True statements 

 Both were elected to congress in '46: Lincoln was elected in 1846 from Illinois, and Kennedy was elected in 1946 from Massachusetts.
 Both were elected to the presidency in '60: Lincoln was elected in 1860, and Kennedy was elected in 1960.
 Both have seven letters in their last names ("Lincoln" and "Kennedy").
 Both were concerned with civil rights: 
Lincoln felt strongly that all slaves should be freed and issued the Emancipation Proclamation, which legally freed slaves within the Confederacy.
Kennedy was concerned with racial equality and was the first to propose what would be the Civil Rights Act of 1964.
Both married in their 30s to women who were in their 20s: 
Lincoln was married on November 4, 1842, Lincoln was born on February 12, 1809, making him 33 years old at the time of his wedding. Lincoln's bride, Mary Anne Todd, was born on December 13, 1818, making her 23 years old at the time of the wedding. 
Kennedy was married on September 12, 1953, Kennedy was born on May 29, 1917, making him 36 years old at the time of his wedding. Kennedy's bride, Jacqueline Bouvier, was born on July 28, 1929, making her 24 years old at the time of the wedding.
 Both were shot on a Friday: Lincoln was shot on Good Friday, April 14, 1865, and Kennedy was shot on Friday, November 22, 1963.
 Both were shot in the head. (Lincoln and Kennedy).
Both of the presidents' successors were named Johnson: Lincoln was succeeded by Andrew Johnson, and Kennedy was succeeded by Lyndon B. Johnson.
Both were succeeded by Southerners: Andrew Johnson was from Tennessee, and Lyndon B. Johnson was from Texas.
Both successors were born in '08: Andrew Johnson was born December 29, 1808, and Lyndon B. Johnson was born August 27, 1908
Both assassins, John Wilkes Booth and Lee Harvey Oswald, are known by their three names,  although this is common for many notorious assassins who are covered by the press (see Mark David Chapman). This is routinely done by the press to avoid tarnishing the reputations of people with similar names (i.e. there are many John Booths, Lee Oswalds, and Mark Chapmans).
Each assassin's full name is composed of fifteen letters.

Uncertain assumptions 

Booth and Oswald were assassinated before their trials: 
On April 26, 1865, after refusing to surrender, John Wilkes Booth was assassinated by Sergeant Boston Corbett. 
On November 24, 1963, on his way to the county jail, Lee Harvey Oswald was assassinated by night club owner Jack Ruby.

False assumptions 

 Although President Kennedy had a secretary named Lincoln, President Lincoln did not have a secretary named Kennedy. Lincoln's secretaries were John G. Nicolay and John M. Hay
 
Booth ran from the theater and was caught in a warehouse, and Oswald ran from a warehouse and was caught in a theater
Booth did run from Ford's Theatre where he shot Lincoln, but was caught in a barn in Virginia, not a warehouse.
Oswald fled from the Texas School Book Depository, which was a warehouse where Oswald worked and from where he had shot Kennedy, and was arrested in a movie theater.
John Wilkes Booth was born in 1839 and Lee Harvey Oswald was born in 1939
Oswald was born in 1939, but Booth was born in 1838.
Both presidents were assassinated by Southerners
Oswald was born in New Orleans, but Booth, a Confederate/Southern sympathizer, was born in Maryland, a Union state.

Analysis
Some urban folklorists have postulated that the list provided a way for people to make sense of two tragic events in American history by seeking out patterns.  Gardner and others have said that it is relatively easy to find seemingly meaningful patterns relating any two people or events. The psychological phenomenon of apophenia - defined as "the tendency to perceive order in random configurations" - has been proposed as a possible reason for the lists's enduring popularity.

Most of the items above are true, such as the year in which Lincoln and Kennedy were each elected President, but this is not so unusual given that Presidential elections are held only every four years. A few of the items are simply untrue: for example, Lincoln never had a secretary named Kennedy; Lincoln's secretaries were John Hay and John G. Nicolay. However, Lincoln's footman, William H. Crook did advise Lincoln not to go that night to Ford's Theatre.  David Mikklenson, on Snopes, also points out numerous ways in which Lincoln and Kennedy don't match, to show the superficial nature of the alleged coincidences: For example, Lincoln was born in 1809 but Kennedy in 1917; though Lincoln and Kennedy were both elected in '60, Lincoln was already in his second term when assassinated but Kennedy was not, and neither the years, months, nor dates of their assassinations match.

Musical remembrance
Buddy Starcher wrote a song recounting many of these coincidences and parallels between the two presidents' careers and deaths entitled "History Repeats Itself." It became a U.S. Top 40 hit for him during the spring of 1966, and reached number two on the Country chart. Cab Calloway also scored a minor chart hit with the song that same year.

See also
Birthday problem
Data dredging
Dark Side of the Rainbow
Kennedy curse

References

External links
"Linkin' Kennedy" article at Snopes.com

Abraham Lincoln-related lists
American folklore
Assassination of Abraham Lincoln
Assassination of John F. Kennedy
Coincidence
John F. Kennedy-related lists
Urban legends